This is a list of Doctorate degree programs (PhD or professional doctorate) with formal specializations / concentrations in Bioethics, by country. These may be dedicated degrees in Bioethics, or specializations within other disciplinary programs, such as philosophy, law or health sciences. They may refer to bioethics, health ethics, healthcare ethics, etc. And hey may also be associated or offered in conjunction with Bioethics Centers and Institutes.

Africa

Nigeria 

 University of Ibadan - PhD in Bioethics

Australasia

Australia 

 Monash University - PhD in Philosophy, Bioethics specialization
University of Sydney - PhD, Bioethics specialization

New Zealand 

 University of Otago - PhD in Bioethics

Europe

Belgium 

University of Leuven - Centre for Biomedical Ethics and Law - PhD in  Biomedical Sciences, Bioethics specialization

Czech Republic 

Masaryk University - PhD in Bioethics

Greece 

University of Crete - PhD in Bioethics

Portugal 

 University of Porto - PhD in Bioethics

Spain 

 University of Barcelona - PhD in Bioethics and Law
Valencia Catholic University Saint Vincent Martyr - PhD in Bioethics

Switzerland 

University of Basel - PhD in Bioethics, Health Policy and Legal Medicine
University of Geneva - PhD in Biomedical Science, Bioethics specialization
University of Zurich - PhD in Biomedical Ethics and Law
ETH Zurich (Swiss Federal Institute of Technology in Zurich) - PhD in Bioethics

United Kingdom 

 University of Birmingham
PhD in Biomedical Ethics
PhD in Philosophy, Global Ethics specialization
 University of Bristol - PhD in Ethics and Medicine
 University of Manchester - PhD in Bioethics and Medical Jurisprudence

Intergovernmental 

 EUCLID (University) - PhD in Bioethics (Clinical and Global Health Bioethics)

North America

Canada 

Université de Montréal
 PhD in Bioethics
 PhD in Biomedical Science, clinical ethics option
University of Toronto
 PhD (Philosophy, Nursing, Health Sciences, etc.) bioethics specialization

Mexico 

 Universidad Anáhuac México - Doctorate of Bioethics

United States 

Albany Medical College - Doctorate of Professional Studies in Bioethics
Brown University - PhD in Social Ethics
Duquesne University - PhD and DHCE in Healthcare Ethics
Icahn School of Medicine at Mount Sinai & Clarkson University - PhD in Philosophy/Master in Bioethics
Johns Hopkins University - PhD in Health Policy & Management, concentration in Bioethics & Health Policy
Loyola University Chicago - Doctor of Bioethics
Case Western Reserve University - PhD in Bioethics
Michigan State University - PhD in Philosophy, Concentration in Philosophy and Ethics of Health Care
Pennsylvania State University - PhD in Anthropology and Bioethics; PhD in Biobehavioral Health and Bioethics; PhD in Communication Arts and Sciences and Bioethics; PhD in Kinesiology and Bioethics; and PhD in Nursing and Bioethics
Saint Louis University - PhD in Health Care Ethics
University at Albany, SUNY - PhD in Philosophy/MS Bioethics

South America

Colombia 

 El Bosque University - PhD in Bioethics
 Nueva Granada Military University - PhD in Bioethics

Sources 

 The Hastings Center - Graduate Programs
 American Society for Bioethics and Humanities - Bioethics and Humanities Academic Programs
 Bioethics.com - Academic Degree and Certificate Programs
 List of Canadian bioethics programs

References 

Postgraduate schools
Bioethics